List of LGBT rights by region, including countries, commonwealths, disputed territories, and other regions.

International regions
 LGBT rights in La Francophonie
 LGBT rights in the Commonwealth of Nations
 LGBT rights in the Balkans
 LGBT rights in the Middle East
 LGBT rights in the European Union
 LGBT rights in the Post-Soviet states

Africa

 Algeria
 Angola
  Benin
 Botswana
 Burkina Faso
 Burundi
 Cameroon
 Cape Verde
 Central African Republic
 Chad
 Comoros
 Republic of the Congo
 Democratic Republic of the Congo
 Djibouti
 Egypt
 Eritrea
 Eswatini (Swaziland)
 Ethiopia
 Equatorial Guinea
 Gabon
 Gambia
 Ghana
 Guinea
 Guinea-Bissau
 Ivory Coast
 Kenya
 Lesotho
 Liberia
 Libya
 Madagascar
 Malawi
 Mali
 Mauritania
 Mauritius
 Morocco
 Mozambique
 Namibia
 Niger
 Nigeria
 Rwanda
 São Tomé and Príncipe
 Senegal
 Seychelles
 Sierra Leone
 Somalia
 South Africa
 South Sudan
 Sudan
 Tanzania
 Togo
 Tunisia
 Uganda
 Zambia
 Zimbabwe

Other regions

 Ascension Island
 Mayotte
 Réunion
 Somaliland
 Saint Helena
 Tristan da Cunha
 Sahrawi Arab Democratic Republic

Americas

 Antigua and Barbuda
 Argentina
 Bahamas
 Barbados
 Belize
 Bolivia
 Brazil
 Canada
 Chile
 Colombia
 Costa Rica
 Cuba
 Dominica
 Dominican Republic
 Ecuador
 El Salvador
 Grenada
 Guatemala
 Guyana
 Haiti
 Honduras
 Jamaica
 Mexico
 Nicaragua
 Panama
 Paraguay
 Peru
 Saint Kitts and Nevis
 Saint Lucia
 Saint Vincent and the Grenadines
 Suriname
 Trinidad and Tobago
 United States
 Uruguay
 Venezuela

Other regions

 Anguilla
 Aruba
 Bermuda
 Bonaire
 British Virgin Islands
 Cayman Islands
 Curaçao
 Falkland Islands
 French Guiana
 Greenland
 Guadeloupe
 Martinique
 Montserrat
 Puerto Rico
 Saba
 Saint Barthélemy
 Saint Martin
 Saint Pierre and Miquelon
 Sint Eustatius
 Sint Maarten
 Turks and Caicos Islands
 U.S. Virgin Islands

Antarctica
As Antarctica has no resident human population, the human presence there is limited to short-term research or sporting expeditions. The Antarctic Treaty System provides that all legal rights in Antarctica are governed by those of the person's home nation, and do not change based on which country's Antarctic territorial claim the person happens to be present in at any given time.

 Argentine Antarctica
 Australian Antarctic Territory
 Bouvet Island
 British Antarctic Territory
 French Southern and Antarctic Lands
 Heard and MacDonald Islands
 Magallanes and Chilean Antarctica
 Peter I Island
 Prince Edward Islands
 Queen Maud Land
 Ross Dependency
 South Georgia and South Sandwich Islands

Asia

 Afghanistan
 Bahrain
 Bangladesh
 Bhutan
 Brunei
 Cambodia
 People's Republic of China
 East Timor
 India
 Indonesia
 Iran
 Iraq
 Israel
 Japan
 Jordan
 Kazakhstan
 Kuwait
 Kyrgyzstan
 Laos
 Lebanon
 Malaysia
 Maldives
 Mongolia
 Myanmar
 Nepal
 North Korea
 Oman
 Pakistan
 Philippines
 Qatar
 Saudi Arabia
 Singapore
 South Korea
 Sri Lanka
 Syria
 Tajikistan
 Thailand
 Turkmenistan
 United Arab Emirates
 Uzbekistan
 Vietnam
 Yemen

Other regions

 Hong Kong
 Macau
 Palestine
 Taiwan (Republic of China)

Europe

 Albania
 Andorra
 Armenia
 Austria
 Azerbaijan
 Belarus
 Belgium
 Bosnia and Herzegovina
 Bulgaria
 Croatia
 Cyprus
 Czech Republic
 Denmark
 Estonia
 Finland
 France
 Georgia
 Germany
 Greece
 Hungary
 Iceland
 Ireland
 Italy
 Latvia
 Liechtenstein
 Lithuania
 Luxembourg
 Malta
 Moldova
 Monaco
 Montenegro
 Netherlands
 North Macedonia
 Norway
 Poland
 Portugal
 Romania
 Russia
 San Marino
 Serbia
 Slovakia
 Slovenia
 Spain
 Sweden
 Switzerland
 Turkey
 Ukraine
 United Kingdom

Other regions

 Abkhazia
 Artsakh
 Faroe Islands
 Gibraltar
 Guernsey
 Isle of Man
 Jersey
 Kosovo
 Northern Cyprus
 South Ossetia
 Transnistria
 Vatican City

Oceania

 Australia
 Fiji
 Kiribati
 Marshall Islands
 Federated States of Micronesia
 Nauru
 New Zealand
 Palau
 Papua New Guinea
 Samoa
 Solomon Islands
 Tonga
 Tuvalu
 Vanuatu

Other regions

 American Samoa
 Cook Islands
 Easter Island
 French Polynesia
 Guam
 New Caledonia
 Niue
 Northern Mariana Islands
 Pitcairn Islands
 Tokelau
 US Minor Outlying Islands
 Wallis and Futuna

See also

LGBT rights by country or territory
LGBT rights at the United Nations

Rights Articles By Region

Human rights-related lists
Lists by region

el:Δικαιώματα ΛΟΑΤ ανά χώρα